"A Dream" is a single by rapper Common from the soundtrack to Freedom Writers. It is produced by will.i.am, who also sings the song's chorus. The song heavily samples Martin Luther King Jr.'s historical "I Have a Dream" speech, which relates to the song's lyrics about racism. The single release of "A Dream" includes two will.i.am tracks, "Colors" and "Bus Ride."

Music video
The video for the single contains images from the Freedom Writers movie (many of which feature Hilary Swank, its lead actress), mixed with animated series with will.i.am singing on a platform and Common rapping in corridor and bedrooms before stylized images of the Civil Rights Movement. Television footage of the "I Have a Dream" speech is exposed on guide throughout the video.  The imagery is destined to increase the song's messages of determination in the face of discrimination, and ambition for a racially equal world.

Track listing
 "A Dream"
 "Colors"
 "Bus Ride"

Chart positions

See also
 List of Common songs
 Civil rights movement in popular culture

References

2006 singles
2006 songs
Common (rapper) songs
Will.i.am songs
Songs written by will.i.am
Songs about Martin Luther King Jr.
Songs about freedom
Songs based on speech samples
Songs written by Common (rapper)
Hollywood Records singles